Thornton is a settlement in the Bay of Plenty Region of New Zealand.

In 1911 the Rangitaiki River was put into a straight channel at the current site of Thornton, which enabled draining the Rangitaiki Plains and converting this swamp land into dairy country.

Education

References

Whakatane District
Populated places in the Bay of Plenty Region